This is a list of Regional Member changes (co-options) to the Senedd (Welsh Parliament; ; formerly the National Assembly of Wales before 2020). Under the provisions of the Government of Wales Act, 1998, regional members of the Senedd who resign, die or are otherwise disqualified are replaced by the next available and willing person of their original party's list, and no by-election occurs.

These are the co-options that have occurred since the first elections in 1999.

No co-options occurred during the Second Assembly (2003–2007).

See also
List of by-elections to the Senedd
List of Welsh AMs/MSs with the shortest service
Regional Member changes in the Scottish Parliament

References

Senedd